Ho Gana Pokuna (The Singing Pond)  is a 2015 Sri Lankan children's musical drama film written and directed by Indika Ferdinando. It depicts a teacher in a remote village, Uma (Anasuya Subasinghe), teaching her students to focus on something they have never seen before.

The film was awarded the Teacher's Choice Prize at the 31st Chicago International Children's Film Festival, Best Feature Film at the 38th Lucas International Children's Festival, and the City of Zlin Award at the 55th Zlín Film Festival. It had its world premiere at the Shanghai International Film Festival and was designated as the official selection at the Hanoi International Film Festival.

Plot
A new teacher, Uma (Anasuya Subasinghe), arrives at a school with her first appointment in a remote village near Dambulla in Sri Lanka. The school has few students, with only the principal (Lucian Bulathsinghala) and Uma as the teacher. With the help of Uma the pupils gradually start to dream of bigger things than they ever imagined.

One day Upuli, a blind girl, shares her unseen dream with school friends Sukiri and Ukkun. It gradually becomes the dream throughout the village. The children and Uma encounter perils in their venture to realise this dream. The children of the school start to focus on something they have never seen before. This target gives rise to a small revolution.

Film crew
The movie was directed by Indika Ferdinando. It was produced by Kusumsiri Liyanarachi, Yashodara Sarachchandra, Dayananda Liyanarachi, Shyama Athukorala, Bimal Fernando, Nirosha Fernando, and Geetha Muthumala. Principal photography was undertaken by Channa Deshapriya and editing by Thissa Surendra.

Cast
 Anusuya Subasinghe as Uma 
 Lucien Bulathsinhala as School principal
 Jayalath Manoratne as Bus driver Justin
 Dayadewa Edirisinghe as Gramasevaka
 Jayani Senanayake as Chithra, Gramasevaka's wife
 Hyacinth Wijeratne as Principal's wife
 Senat Dikkumbura as Mudalali
 Geetha Kanthi Jayakody as Justin's wife
 Ama Wijesekera as Tailor woman
 Jagath Chamila as Madhuwantha, Uma's lover (only voice)
 D.B. Gangodathenna as Kiri Aththa
 Chathuranga Wijethunga 
 Senaka Titus as Sudu Banda
 Ananda Kumara Unnehe as Farmer
 Wasantha Muhandiram as Pushpakumara

Child actors
 Thishakya Kumaratunga
 Anjali Methsara as Blind girl
 Sathsara Jayasuriya
 Nethpriya Manubhashitha
 Senith Valpotagamage
 Sethika Gunasinghe
 Nihansa Dissanayake
 Vinod Saleem
 Udara Perera
 Wasana Pathirana
 Kimuthu Liyanaarchchi
 Maleesha Muthuarachchi
 Nileesha Dinethmi
 Vishmi Sathsarani
 Deshan Abeweera
 Navoda Hansini
 Vinumi Vinsadi
 Nesta Maneth

Musical score
The film's score and songs were composed and conducted by Dinesh Subasinghe. Vocals for the theme song, "Rata Pena Kiri Haawa", were provided by Thrishala Wijethunga with background vocals by Dewmini Fernando, Dinith Ridhmika, Banuka Senivirathna and Nishami Naizara.

Sound track
The sound track of the movie was released on M Entertainment music. The musical score has been admired by the Hanoi film jury and Chicago media journalists. The soundtrack was recorded by Rajeewa Jayawickrama and finalised by Shashika Ruwan Maarasinghe in Chennai.

Awards and nominations

International Awards

Awards in Sri Lankan Film Festivals

4th Derana Sunsilk Film Awards 2016
Ho Gana Pokuna movie has got nine nominations & won six awards at the 4th Derana Sunsilk Film Awards 2016 at Nelum pokuna Thearter on 14 May 2016Jury AwardsSpecial award for Anasuya Subasinghe.
Highest Grossing Movie

2nd Hiru Golden Film Awards 2016Jury AwardsSpecial Award for Anjali Wickramasinghe

36th SIGNIS Awards (OCIC) 2016 Jury AwardsSpecial Award for Anjali Wickramasinghe

33rd Sarasaviya Awards Jury Merit AwardsDinesh Subasinghe
Thisakya Kumaratunge

Presidential Film Awards 2017Jury Merit Awards'Thishakya Sankalana Kumarathunga
Senith Sathwiru Walpitagamage
Sathsara Sawan Jayasooriya
Senitha Dinith Gunasinhe
Nethpriya Madhubhashitha Ranawakarachchige

Box office
The film completed 100 days and went up to 147 days until the release date of movie Paththini''. It was a huge box office success in Sri Lanka and won the Highest Grossing movie Award at the 4th Derana Sunsilk Film Festival. The film was recorded as the first Sri Lankan movie to be released in Blu-Ray technology.

References

External links
 Official website

Hogaana Pokuna (The Singing Pond) at Zlin Festival
Singing pond at Hannoi international film festival
The Singing Pond at Monash University Art news
 Ho Gaana Pokuna at Cinema.lk
Ho Gaana Pokuna on The Island
Ho Gaana Pokuna at the National Film Corporation 
 දයාදේව එදිරිසිංහ හෝ ගානා පොකුණේ අත්දැකීම් හෙළිකරයි
 හෝ ගානා පොකුණ ගතානුගතිකත්වයෙන් මිදුණු චිත්‍රපටයක්
 හෝ ගානා පොකුණෙන් ලෝක සිනමාවේ වාර්තාවක්

2000s Sinhala-language films
2005 films
2005 drama films
Film soundtracks
Film scores
Sri Lankan drama films